William Buckner may refer to

William Quinn Buckner (born 1954), former American basketball player and coach
Bill Buckner (born 1949), former Major League Baseball first baseman 
Billy Buckner (born 1983), Major League Baseball pitcher 
William Buckner (Irish MP), Irish politician, for Dungarvan
William Buckner (priest) (1605–1657), English Anglican priest

See also
Buckner (disambiguation)#People